Balija Point is the point on the south side of the entrance to Beripara Cove on the southeast coast of Liège Island in the Palmer Archipelago, Antarctica. British mapping in 1978.

Maps
 British Antarctic Territory.  Scale 1:200000 topographic map.  DOS 610 Series, Sheet W 64 60.  Directorate of Overseas Surveys, UK, 1978.
 Antarctic Digital Database (ADD). Scale 1:250000 topographic map of Antarctica. Scientific Committee on Antarctic Research (SCAR). Since 1993, regularly upgraded and updated.

References
 Punta Balija. SCAR Composite Antarctic Gazetteer.
 Balija Point Copernix satellite image

Headlands of the Palmer Archipelago
Liège Island